The 2011 Red Deer Curling Classic was held from November 4 to 7 at the Red Deer Curling Club in Red Deer, Alberta as part of the 2011–12 World Curling Tour. The purse for the men's event was CAD$32,000, while the purse for the women's event was CAD$34,000. Both events were held in a triple knockout format.

Men

Teams

Knockout results

A event

B event

C event

Playoffs

Women

Teams

Knockout results

A event

B event

C-Event

Playoffs

References

External links

Red Deer Classic
Red Deer Curling Classic
Red Deer Curling
Red Deer Curling
Sports competitions in Red Deer, Alberta
Curling in Alberta